Contreras Motorsports was a Mexican professional stock car racing team that competed in the NASCAR Camping World Truck Series. The team was owned by Carlos Contreras and his nephew Enrique. The team fielded the No. 71 Chevrolet Silverado full-time for various drivers. During operation, they were the sole Mexican team in the three national divisions of NASCAR.

Camping World Truck Series

Truck No. 71 history
The No. 71 truck began racing in 2016. Their first race was the Great Clips 200 because they did not qualify for the NextEra Energy Resources 250. Carlos Contreras drove the first race, with funding from RaceTrac convenience stores. Several up-and coming drivers raced for the team in its inaugural season, including JR Motorsports development driver Josh Berry and Israeli Alon Day. the team also brought in experienced drivers, such as Ken Schrader and Mike Bliss. It was announced on December 25 that Brandon Hightower would drive for the team full-time in 2017.

Partnerships

JR Motorsports  
On October 29, 2016, Contreras Motorsports ran a truck for Chase Elliott at Martinsville; the truck was built by JR Motorsports. He qualified on the pole and finished second.

Ranier Racing with MDM 
Ranier Racing with MDM ran some races in 2016 with the No. 71 with Austin Dillon and Brandon Jones driving. Jones drove at Dover, Charlotte, Iowa, Kentucky and Bristol. Dillon drove at Texas. Between the two drivers, they recorded three top-ten finishes.

Ken Schrader Racing 
In 2016 Contreras Motorsports partnered with Ken Schrader Racing to run the Aspen Dental Eldora Dirt Derby in the No. 71 Toyota Tundra. Ken Schrader drove the truck sponsored by Hunt Brothers Pizza. Schrader drove the truck to a 12th-place finish.

Ending of operations 
Before the 2017 season, the assets and ownership of the team was transferred to business partner and crew veteran D. J. Copp to form Copp Motorsports.

References 

Defunct NASCAR teams